Ingrid Hafner (13 November 1936 – 20 May 1994) was a British actress, born in London. Her father was Raoul Hafner, an Austrian helicopter pioneer, and her mother Eileen Myra McAdam was a descendant of Scottish-born John Loudon McAdam, the road builder.

Career

Film and television
Her first film role was as Ursula in 'The Quarry', made for television and directed by John Boorman - his first fiction work as distinct from his documentary films for the BBC in the West of England.  She is best remembered for her role as Carol Wilson in the first season of the television series The Avengers. She had previously played Amanda Gibbs opposite Ian Hendry in the series Police Surgeon. She also appeared as Laura Granton in The Main Chance. She appeared as Kay Price in an episode of Public Eye in 1975.On cinema she played Giselle Dureaux in the 1960 film Bluebeard's Ten Honeymoons starring George Sanders, and later appeared opposite Sanders again in The Amorous Adventures of Moll Flanders (1965).

Theatre
Hafner studied at the Bristol Old Vic Theatre School and subsequently joined the Old Vic under Michael Benthall, where she played ‘Sylvia’ in The Two Gentlemen of Verona; ‘Lavina’ in Titus Andronicus, ‘Iris’ in Anthony and Cleopatra and ‘Lady Anne’ in Richard III.

Her other theatre work included repertory at Windsor, Colchester, Glasgow Citizens, Richmond Theatre (15 plays), From the French at the Strand Theatre in the West End, Jungle in the Cities at Stratford East and numerous productions at the Bristol Old Vic, including her first appearance  there in Cyrano, in which she played Roxanne.

Death
The 57-year-old Hafner died in 1994 from motor neurone disease, leaving husband Richard Clothier and two sons, Ben and William.

Selected filmography
 Bluebeard's Ten Honeymoons (1960) - Giselle
 Edgar Wallace Mysteries (1963) Episode: Five to One (film) - Pat Dunn
 Dilemma (1962) - Jean Barnes
 The Amorous Adventures of Moll Flanders (1965) - Elder Sister

References

External links
 

1936 births
1994 deaths
English television actresses
Deaths from motor neuron disease
Neurological disease deaths in England
20th-century English actresses
English people of Austrian descent
English people of Scottish descent